Mimabryna is a genus of longhorn beetles of the subfamily Lamiinae, containing the following species:

 Mimabryna borneotica Breuning, 1966
 Mimabryna nicobarica Breuning, 1938

References

Pteropliini